Hemant Talwalkar (6 March 1954 – 20 November 2016) was an Indian cricketer. He played ten first-class matches for Maharashtra between 1977/78 and 1984/85.

See also
 List of Maharashtra cricketers

References

External links
 

1954 births
2016 deaths
Indian cricketers
Maharashtra cricketers
Cricketers from Pune